This is a list of notable people from Newark, New Jersey.

Academics and science

 Steve Adubato Sr. (1932–2020), founder of Robert Treat Academy Charter School
 Alan P. Bell (1932–2002), psychologist who worked at the Kinsey Institute
 Cornelia Chase Brant (1863–1959), Dean of New York Medical College and Hospital for Women
 Jabez Campfield (1737–1821), doctor who served as a surgeon in the Continental Army during the American Revolutionary War
 Robert Curvin (1934–2015), researcher and theorist on issues related to urban poverty
 John Cotton Dana (1856–1929), public librarian and founder of the Newark Museum
 Carl Neumann Degler (1921–2014), historian and Pulitzer Prize winning author
 Adele Dunlap (1902–2017), educator, was the oldest living American (from July 8, 2016, to February 5, 2017)
 Arnie Kantrowitz (1940–2022), LGBT activist and college professor
 Peter Knobel (1943–2019), Reform rabbi, educator and editor
 Leonard Krieger (1918–1990), historian who paid particular attention to Modern Europe, particularly being known as an author on Germany
 Ernest Mae McCarroll (1898–1990), medical doctor who became the first African American physician to be appointed to the staff of the Newark City Hospital, in 1946
 August Meier (1923–2003), professor of history at Kent State University and a scholar on African American history
 Charles Anthony Micchelli (born 1942), mathematician who has focused on numerical analysis, approximation theory and machine learning
 Edward Morley (1838–1923), scientist best known for his role in the Michelson–Morley experiment, whose negative results paved the way for Albert Einstein's special relativity
 Joseph S. Murphy (1933–1998), political scientist and university administrator, who was president of Queens College, president of Bennington College and chancellor of the City University of New York
 James B. Nies (1856–1922), Episcopal minister and Assyriologist who was president of the American Oriental Society in 1921
 John Alsop Paine (1840–1912), Presbyterian minister, botanist, professor of natural history and German, archaeologist and editor
 Sam Porcello (1935–2012), food scientist who developed the Oreo cookie filling
 Eugene G. Rochow (1909–2002), inorganic chemist and winner of the Perkin Medal
 Gaddis Smith (1932–2022), historian at Yale University and an expert on U.S. foreign relations and maritime history
 Barbara Stanley (1949–2023), psychologist, researcher, and suicidologist
 Harold Widom (1932–2021), mathematician best known for his contributions to operator theory and random matrices
 Charles D. Wrege (1924–2014), management historian and professor at Rutgers University
 Lewis Yablonsky (1924–2014), sociologist, criminologist, author, and psychotherapist best known for his innovative and experiential work with gang members

Arts

Architecture
 Peter Eisenman (born 1932), architect
 Daniel Riggs Huntington (1871–1962), architect best known for his work in Seattle
 Richard Meier (born 1934), Pritzker Prize-winning architect

Authors

 Paul Auster (born 1947), author, known for works blending absurdism and crime fiction
 Amina Baraka (born 1942 as Sylvia Robinson), poet, actress, author, community organizer, singer, dancer and activist
 Amiri Baraka (1934–2014), Poet Laureate of New Jersey
 Albert Boni (1892–1981), publisher
 Milton W. Brown (1911–1998), New York art historian who wrote American Painting from the Armory Show to the Depression
 Niobia Bryant (born 1972), author, who also writes under the pseudonym Meesha Mink
 John W. Campbell (1910–1971), science fiction writer who was editor of Astounding Science Fiction from 1937 until his death
 Harlan Coben (born 1962), novelist
 Stephen Crane (1871–1900), author, known for the 1895 Civil War novel The Red Badge of Courage
 Amanda Minnie Douglas (1831–1916), children's author
 Ken Eulo (born 1939), Eugene O'Neill Award-winning writer and bestselling author whose novels have collectively sold over 13 million copies worldwide
 Eloise Alma Flagg (1918–2018), first African American woman to be a school principal in Newark, New Jersey
 Allen Ginsberg (1926–1997), poet, known for the 1956 poem "Howl"
 Dan Gutman (born 1955), writer, primarily of children's fiction
 Andrew Hubner (born 1962), novelist
 Andrew Jacobs, journalist with The New York Times and documentary film director / producer
 Jim Murphy (1947–2022), author of more than nonfiction and fiction books for children, young adults, and general audiences, including more than 30 about American history
 Philip Roth (1933–2018), author
 David Shapiro (born 1947), poet and art historian
 Dave Toma, former Newark Police Department police detective whose undercover work and battles with his superiors became the basis of the television series Toma, which ran on the ABC network from 1973 to 1974
 Richard Wesley (born 1945), playwright and screenwriter
 Thomas Chatterton Williams (born 1981), cultural critic and author, whose works include the 2019 book Self-Portrait in Black and White
 Ruth Winter (born 1930), journalist and science writer
 William Woestendiek (1920–2015), editor and journalist

Fine arts
 Hilda Belcher (1881–1963), artist known for her paintings, watercolors, and portraits
 Judith Bernstein (born 1942), painter known for her large-scale paintings of penises
 Robert Birmelin (born 1933), figurative painter, printmaker and draughtsman
 Franco Castelluccio (born 1955), sculptor.
 Carmen Cicero (born 1926), painter
 Andre de Krayewski (1933–2018), painter
 M. Asli Dukan (born 1973), independent media producer, filmmaker and visual artist working with themes of speculative fiction
 Amaranth Ehrenhalt (1928–2021), painter, sculptor, and writer
 Robert Farber (born 1944), photographer, known for his work with female nudes, fashion and still lifes
 Jerry Gant (1961–2018), visual artist, poet, performance artist and educator
 John R. Grabach (1886–1981), painter, known for his social and urban realism works of working class New Jersey and New York
 Walter Granville-Smith (1870–1938) illustrator and painter who produced the first colored illustration that appeared in the United States.
 Tom Patrick Green (1942–2012), painter and professor
 Akintola Hanif (born 1972), photographer
 Alexander F. Harmer (1856–1925), painter who has been described as the first prominent painter of California.
 Grace Hartigan (1922–2008), abstract expressionist painter, member of the post-war avant-garde New York School
 Eleanor Kish (1924–2014), artist best known for her paleoart depicting dinosaurs during the 1970s until the mid 1990s, many of which are on public display in museum collections
 Douglas Kolk (1963–2014), artist known for drawing and work in collage and mixed media
Barbara Kruger (born 1945), conceptual artist
 Lee Lozano (1930–1999), painter and conceptual artist
 Nina Howell Starr (1903–2000), photographer, art historian and art dealer
 Philip Stein (1919–2009), painter

Film, television and theater

 Jason Alexander (born 1959), actor, known for his role in Seinfeld
 John Amos (born 1939), actor who appeared on television in Good Times and The West Wing
 Charita Bauer (1922–1985), soap opera radio and television actress
 Bill Bellamy (born 1965), actor and former MTV VJ
 Taurean Blacque (born 1941), actor, best known for appearing on Hill Street Blues
 Vivian Blaine (1921–1995), actress
 John Carter (1922–2018), film editor whose work includes The Heartbreak Kid and Paper Lion
 Brian De Palma (born 1940), film director
 Ernest Dickerson (born 1951), film and TV director
 Allen Garfield (1939–2020), actor
 Bernard Gersten (1923–2020), theatrical producer
 Ice-T (born 1958), actor and rapper
 Michael B. Jordan (born 1987), actor
 Victor J. Kemper (born 1927), cinematographer
 Jerome Kern (1885–1945), composer credited with the idea of making Edna Ferber's novel Show Boat into a musical; also composed its music as well as the scores for many other shows; he considered "Ol' Man River" his masterpiece
 Jerry Lewis (1926–2017), actor, director and comedian
 Ray Liotta (1954–2022), actor
The Lucas Bros. (born 1985), Academy Award-nominated writers and producers of Judas and the Black Messiah, stand-up comedians
 Bebe Neuwirth (born 1958), stage, TV and film actress
 Okieriete Onaodowan (born 1987), actor
 Leighton Osmun (1880–1928), screenwriter, playwright, and author who was active during Hollywood's silent era
 Joe Pesci (born 1943), Academy Award-winning actor
 Keshia Knight Pulliam (born 1979), actress; played Cliff Huxtable's youngest daughter Rudy on The Cosby Show
 B.S. Pully (1910–1972; born Murray Lerman), nightclub comedian and stage actor who created the role of Big Jule in the musical Guys and Dolls
 Queen Latifah (born 1970), Academy Award-nominated actress, Grammy Award-winning rapper and singer
 Retta (born 1970), comedienne and actress, known for playing Donna Meagle in Parks and Recreation
 Joe Rogan (born 1967), comedian, host of Fear Factor and The Joe Rogan Experience podcast
 Eva Marie Saint (born 1924), Academy Award-winning actress
 Todd Solondz (born 1959), independent film director and screenwriter
 Trish Vradenburg (1946–2017), playwright, author, television writer and advocate of research to cure Alzheimer's disease
 Jack Warden (1920–2006), two-time Academy Award-nominated actor
 Thea White (1940–2021), voice actress best known for her work as Muriel Bagge in the animated TV show Courage the Cowardly Dog
 J. D. Williams (born 1978), actor
 Ian Ziering (born 1964), actor, known for playing Steve Sanders on the television series Beverly Hills, 90210

Music

 Tawatha Agee (born 1953), singer-songwriter
 Andy Bey (born 1939), jazz singer and pianist
 Geraldine Bey (born 1935), jazz singer and concert organizer
 Salome Bey (1933–2020), singer-songwriter
 Lou Brutus (born 1972), radio host, musician and photographer
 John-Michael Caprio (1947–1997), conductor
 Betty Carter (1929–1998), jazz singer
 Eric Chasalow (born 1955), composer of acoustic and electronic music
 Bill Chinnock (1947–2007), singer-songwriter and guitarist; part of the Asbury Park music scene with Bruce Springsteen in the late 1960s
 Kat DeLuna (born 1987), singer
 Rah Digga (born 1972), rapper
 Faith Evans (born 1973), singer-songwriter
 Ted Fio Rito (1900–1971), singer-songwriter
 Connie Francis (born 1938), singer of hit songs such as "Who's Sorry Now?" and "Where the Boys Are"
 Fugees, hip-hop group
 Gloria Gaynor (born 1949), singer, known for disco-era hits including "I Will Survive"
 Savion Glover (born 1973), actor, tap dancer and choreographer
 Lorraine Gordon (1922–2018), longtime owner of the Village Vanguard jazz club in New York City's Greenwich Village
 John Gorka (born 1958), folk musician
 Young Guru (born 1974 as Gimel Androus Keaton), audio engineer, record producer, disc jockey, and record executive
 Gwen Guthrie (1950–1999), R&B and soul singer with dance hits "Ain't Nothin' Goin' On but the Rent" and "It Should've Been You"
 Stefon Harris (born 1973), jazz vibraphonist
 Cissy Houston (born 1933), soul and gospel singer
 Whitney Houston (1963–2012), singer and actress, also a member of the Rock And Roll Hall Of Fame
 Mach-Hommy, Haitian-American rapper and record producer
 Nick Massi (1935–2000), Rock and Roll Hall of Fame member, as part of The Four Seasons
 James Moody (1925–2010), jazz saxophonist and flute player
 Melba Moore (born 1945), actress and singer
 Tame One (born 1970 as Rahem Brown), hip hop artist of the rap duo Artifacts
 Outsidaz, rap group
 Charlie Persip (1929–2020), jazz drummer
 Redman (born 1970), rapper
 Marc Ribot (born 1954), guitarist and composer
 Fred Schneider (born 1951), singer-songwriter, arranger and musician, best known as the frontman of the rock band the B-52's, of which he is a founding member
 Woody Shaw (1944–1989), jazz trumpeter and composer
 Wayne Shorter (born 1933), jazz composer and saxophonist
 Paul Simon (born 1941), songwriter, musician, and member of the Rock and Roll Hall of Fame
 Tyshawn Sorey (born 1980), drummer and composer
 Frankie Valli (born 1934), singer, frontman of The Four Seasons, member of the Rock and Roll Hall of Fame
 Sarah Vaughan (1924–1990), jazz singer
 Marlene VerPlanck (1933–2018), jazz and pop vocalist whose body of work centered on big band jazz, the American songbook and cabaret
 Mikey Way (born 1980), bassist with My Chemical Romance
 Max Weinberg (born 1951), drummer for Bruce Springsteen's E Street Band and The Max Weinberg 7 on Late Night with Conan O'Brien
 Larry Young (1940–1978), jazz organist

Business and industry

 Seth Boyden (1788–1870), inventor, best known for patent leather
 Ray Chambers (born 1942), businessman and philanthropist
 William A. Conway (1910–2006), CEO of Garden State National Bank
 Frederick Eberhardt (1868–1946), engineer, philanthropist, university administrator and president of Gould & Eberhardt
 Martin S. Fox (1924–2020), publisher
 John Jelliff (1813–1893), furniture maker during the second half of the 19th century.
 Dennis Kozlowski (born 1946), businessman and disgraced former CEO of Tyco International
 Thomas N. McCarter (1867–1955), chief executive officer of PSE&G Corporation; developer of Newark's Pennsylvania Station; original benefactor of the McCarter Theatre in Princeton
 Grace Mirabella (1929–2021), fashion journalist who was editor-in-chief of Vogue magazine between 1971 and 1988, after which she founded Mirabella magazine
 Jack Northrop (1895–1981), aviation pioneer
 Marc Roberts (born 1959), entrepreneur, sports manager, real estate developer and businessman
 Brandon 'Scoop B' Robinson, NBA analyst
 Narciso Rodriguez (born 1961), fashion designer
 Arthur A. Schmon (1895–1964), business executive who became a leading figure in the paper industry of Ontario and Quebec
 Jordan Zimmerman (born ), advertising business executive and philanthropist, who is the founder and chairman of Zimmerman Advertising

Crime

 Mary Frances Creighton (1899–1936), housewife, who along with Everett Applegate, was executed in Sing Sing Prison's electric chair, Old Sparky, for the poisoning of Applegate's wife, Ada
 Robert Peace (–2011), subject of The Short and Tragic Life of Robert Peace, a 2002 Yale University graduate and scientist, who operated a hydroponic marijuana farm in Newark, where he was shot to death
 Akbar Pray (born 1948), drug kingpin who was sentenced to life in prison in 1990 for leading a drug gang since the early 1970s
 Abner Zwillman (1904–1959), Jewish American mob boss

Government, politics and community

 Harold A. Ackerman (1928–2009), United States district judge of the United States District Court for the District of New Jersey
 J. LeRoy Baxter (1881–????), dentist / oral surgeon and politician, who was elected to represent Essex County, New Jersey, in the New Jersey General Assembly in 1928
 Cory Booker (born 1969), United States Senator and former mayor of Newark
 William J. Brennan Jr. (1906–1997), Associate Justice of the Supreme Court of the United States
 Michael Donald Brown (born 1953), Shadow United States Senator representing the District of Columbia
 Jacob Burnet (1770–1853), U.S. Senator
 Aaron Burr (1756–1836), politician and Vice President of the United States
 Robert L. Carter (1917–2012), civil rights leader; United States District judge
 Chris Christie (born 1962), 55th Governor of New Jersey
 Silas Condit (1778–1861), represented New Jersey in the United States House of Representatives, 1831–1833
 Steve Corodemus (born 1952), politician who served in the New Jersey General Assembly from 1992 to 2008, where he represented the 11th Legislative District
 Marvin E. Frankel (1920–2002), United States district judge of the United States District Court for the Southern District of New York and human rights activist
 Arline Friscia (1934–2019), politician who served in the New Jersey General Assembly from 1996 to 2002, where she represented the 19th Legislative District
 Jacques Gansler (1934–2018), aerospace electronics engineer, defense contracting executive and public policy expert, who served as Under Secretary of Defense for Acquisition, Technology and Logistics
 Michael Giuliano (1915–1976), politician who served two terms in the New Jersey Senate
 Diane Gutierrez-Scaccetti, former executive director of the New Jersey Turnpike Authority and Florida's Turnpike Enterprise, Commissioner of the New Jersey Department of Transportation
 George A. Halsey (1827–1894), represented New Jersey's 7th congressional district, 1867–1869, and 1871–1873
 R. Graham Huntington (1897–1957), politician who served three terms in the New Jersey General Assembly representing Essex County.
 Abraham Kaiser (1852–1912), businessman, alderman, member of the New Jersey General Assembly
 Ed Koch (1924–2013), Mayor of New York City
 Alexander Matturri (1913–1992), politician and jurist who served in the New Jersey State Senate from 1968 to 1972
 Yaakov Ben Zion Mendelson (1875–1941), served as chief rabbi of the city in the 1920s and 1930s
 John J. Miller Jr. (1923–2012), politician who served in the New Jersey General Assembly from 1962 to 1964.
 Hymen B. Mintz (1909–1986), politician who served in the New Jersey General Assembly from 1954 to 1957
 George DeGraw Moore (1822–1891), Wisconsin State Senator and New Jersey jurist
 Rocco Neri (1919–2011), politician who represented the 28th Legislative District in the New Jersey General Assembly from 1974 to 1976
 Francis F. Patterson Jr. (1867–1935), represented New Jersey's 1st congressional district in the United States House of Representatives, 1920–1927
 Donald M. Payne (1934–2012), member of the United States House of Representatives from New Jersey's 10th congressional district
 Alexander C. M. Pennington (1810–1867), represented  in the United States House of Representatives, 1853–1857
 Hugo Pfaltz (1931–2019), politician who served two terms in the New Jersey General Assembly
 Nicholas H. Politan (1935–2012), attorney who served as a United States district judge of the United States District Court for the District of New Jersey
 Oliver Randolph (1882–1951), first African American to be admitted to the New Jersey bar and second African American elected to the New Jersey Legislature
 Ronald Rice (1945–2023), politician who served in the New Jersey State Senate from 1986 to 2022, where he represented the 28th legislative district
 Peter W. Rodino (1909–2005), member of the United States House of Representatives from New Jersey's 10th congressional district
 Robert A. Salerno, associate judge on the Superior Court of the District of Columbia
 William F. Schnitzler (1904–1983), labor union leader.
 Herbert Norman Schwarzkopf (1895–1958), first superintendent of the New Jersey State Police; father of Desert Storm commander H. Norman Schwarzkopf
 Peter Shapiro (born 1952), financial services executive and former politician who was the youngest person ever elected to the New Jersey General Assembly and went on to serve as Essex County Executive
 Sir Bysshe Shelley (1731–1815), grandfather of radical progressive English poet Percy Shelley was born here
 Craig A. Stanley (born 1955), politician who served in the New Jersey General Assembly from 1996 to 2008, where represented the 28th Legislative District
 Gary Saul Stein (born 1933), attorney and former associate justice of the New Jersey Supreme Court, who served for 17 years where he wrote over 365 published opinions
 Isaac Tichenor (1754–1838), politician who served as the third and fifth Governor of Vermont and as United States Senator
 Anthony M. Villane (1929–2022), dentist and politician who was elected to serve seven terms in the New Jersey General Assembly from 1976 to 1988
 John Beam Vreeland (1852–1923), lawyer who served in the New Jersey Senate and as the United States Attorney for the District of New Jersey
 Milton Waldor (1924–1975), politician who served in the New Jersey State Senate from 1968 to 1972, representing Essex County.
 George M. Wallhauser (1900–1993), Member of United States House of Representatives from New Jersey's 12th congressional district
 Thomas C. Wasson (1896–1948), diplomat who was killed while serving as the Consul General for the United States in Jerusalem
 Evelyn Williams, politician who briefly served in the New Jersey General Assembly representing the 28th Legislative District
 James Zangari (1929–2011), politician who served in the New Jersey General Assembly from the 28th Legislative District from 1980 to 1996
 William Cortenus Schenck (1773-1821), founder of Newark, Ohio, member of the Ohio Senate from 1803 to 1804.

Activists
 Helen Tufts Bailie (1874–1962), women's, labor and social rights activist who outed the Daughters of the American Revolution for having a blacklist
 Earl Best (1947–2021), community activist known as "The Street Doctor"
 Jody Cohen (born 1954), first woman rabbi in Connecticut history and active in Jewish women's movements 
 Muriel Fox (born 1928), feminist activist who was a co-founder of the National Organization for Women
 Charles Jacobs, co-founder of the American Anti-Slavery Group
 Daryle Lamont Jenkins (born 1968), civil rights activist and founder of One People's Project

Military

 Shan K. Bagby (born 1967), U.S. Army brigadier general and the 28th Chief of the Army Dental Corps
 Lawrence N. "Larry" Guarino (1922–2014), spent eight years as a prisoner of war in the Hanoi Hilton prison during the Vietnam War
 LeRoy P. Hunt (1892–1968), United States Marine Corps general who commanded the 2nd Marine Division at the end of World War II
 Stephen W. Kearny (1794–1848), victorious commander of the Army of the West during the Mexican–American War who served as Military Governor of California
 William W. Smith (1888–1966), vice admiral, USN; commanded cruiser task force during the Battles of the Coral Sea and Midway in 1942
 William M. Wright (1863–1943), career officer in the United States Army who attained the rank of lieutenant general and was most notable for his service as a division and corps commander during World War I

Sports

 Jackie Autry (born 1941), Major League Baseball executive
 Trevor Baptiste (born 1996), professional lacrosse midfielder for the Boston Cannons
 Moe Berg (1902–1972), Major League Baseball baseball player and spy
 Jalen Berger, American football running back for the Michigan State Spartans football team.
 Jim Bouton (1939–2019), professional baseball player
 Dino Boyd (born 1996), offensive lineman for the Ottawa Redblacks of the Canadian Football League.
 Da'Sean Butler (born 1987), former basketball player who is currently an assistant coach for the College Park Skyhawks of the NBA G League
 Robinson Canó (born 1982), baseball player
 Rick Cerone (born 1954), professional former baseball player for the New York Yankees and the New York Mets; founder of the Newark Bears
 Andy Chisick (1916–1986), American football center who played in the NFL for the Chicago Cardinals
 Patrick Cole (born 1993), professional basketball player
 Leonard S. Coleman Jr. (born 1949), last president of the National League, serving from 1994 until 1999, when the position was eliminated by Major League Baseball
 Sharife Cooper (born 2001), basketball player
 August Desch (1898–1964), won bronze in the 400-meter hurdles at the 1920 Summer Olympics in Antwerp, Belgium
 Kenneth Faried (born 1989), basketball player for the Denver Nuggets who is the NCAA Division I modern era's all-time leading rebounder
 Randy Foye (born 1983), professional basketball player for the Oklahoma City Thunder
 Awful Gardner (1825–1899), boxer who was one of the first celebrity Christian converts in the United States
 Tate George (born 1968), point guard who played in the NBA for the New Jersey Nets and the Milwaukee Bucks
 Norm Granger (born 1961), former fullback in the National Football League, who played for the Dallas Cowboys and the Atlanta Falcons
 Jerry Greenspan (1941–2019), NBA basketball player
 Marvin Hagler (1954–2021), boxer and former Undisputed World Middleweight Champion who finished his career with a record of 62–3–2 with 52 knockouts and 12 title defenses
 Billy Hamilton (1866–1940), major league baseball player
 Larry Hazzard (born 1944), former amateur boxer, boxing referee, athletic control board commissioner, teacher and actor.
 Larry Hesterfer (1878–1943), pitcher who played a single MLB game in 1901 with the New York Giants, in which he became the only player known to have hit into a triple play in his first major league at bat
 Qadry Ismail (born 1970), former professional football player who played for 10 years in the NFL
 Sheldon Karlin (1950–2000), distance runner who won the New York City Marathon in 1972
 David Levin (1948–2017), balloonist, who is the only person to have completed the "triple crown" by winning the World Gas Balloon Championship, the World Hot Air Ballooning Championships and the Gordon Bennett Cup
 Honey Lott (1925–1980), Negro league outfielder who played for the New York Black Yankees
 Boris Malenko (1933–1994), professional wrestler
 Bobby Malkmus (born 1931), former professional baseball infielder who played in MLB for the Milwaukee Braves, Washington Senators and Philadelphia Phillies
 Richard Matuszewski (born 1964), former professional tennis player
 Art McMahon (born 1946), defensive back for the Boston / New England Patriots football team from 1968 to 1970 and 1972
 Jerron McMillian (born 1989), football safety who played in the NFL for the Green Bay Packers
 Angelo Mongiovi (born 1952), former wheelchair track, basketball, and rugby competitor
 Glenn Mosley (born 1955), former professional basketball player who played in the NBA for the Philadelphia 76ers and San Antonio Spurs
 Renaldo Nehemiah (born 1959), hurdler; played in the NFL
 Shaquille O'Neal (born 1972), professional basketball player, four-time NBA champion
 Lou Palmer (1935–2019), sportscaster who was a SportsCenter anchor and reporter, and was one of the original studio anchors at WFAN, the nation's first all-sports radio station
 Chet Parlavecchio (born 1960), former NFL football player
 Aulcie Perry (born 1950), professional basketball player
 Richie Regan (1930–2002), basketball player and coach who played in the NBA for the Rochester / Cincinnati Royals
 Herb Rich (1928–2008), safety who played in the NFL for the New York Giants, Baltimore Colts and Los Angeles Rams
 Camille Sabie (1902–1998), athlete who represented the United States in several events at the 1922 Women's World Games, winning gold medals in the 110 yd hurdles and standing long jump and a bronze medal in the conventional long jump
 George MacDonald Sacko (1936–2011), captain of the Liberian national soccer team into the 1960s
 Pete Shaw (born 1976), former safety; played eight seasons in the NFL for the San Diego Chargers and the New York Giants
 Alshermond Singleton (born 1975), former football linebacker who played 10 seasons in the NFL for the Tampa Bay Buccaneers and Dallas Cowboys
 David Smukler (1914–1971), American football fullback / linebacker who played in the NFL for the Philadelphia Eagles
 Shakur Stevenson (born 1997), amateur bantamweight boxer who was chosen to be part US boxing team at the 2016 Summer Olympics in Rio de Janeiro
 Andre Tippett (born 1959), Hall of Fame former linebacker with the New England Patriots
 Walt Walsh (1897–1966), Major League Baseball player who played in two games as a pinch runner for the Philadelphia Phillies in 1920, never getting an at-bat
 Art Weiner (1926–2013), end who played in the National Football League for the New York Yanks
 Dick Weisgerber (1915–1984), defensive back, fullback and kicker who played four NFL seasons with the Green Bay Packers
 Peter Westbrook (born 1952) sabre fencing champion and Olympic bronze medalist
 Greg White (born 1979), defensive end for the Tampa Bay Buccaneers
 Tahir Whitehead (born 1990), NFL linebacker, has played for the Detroit Lions
 Earl Williams (1948–2013), Major League Baseball player who was the 1971 NL Rookie of the Year
 Eric Williams (born 1972), former professional basketball player who played for the Boston Celtics and Denver Nuggets

See also

List of people from New Jersey

References

Newark
Newark